The 2011 Southland Conference men's basketball tournament, a part of the 2010–11 NCAA Division I men's basketball season, took place March 9, 10 and 12, 2011 at the Merrell Center in Katy, Texas. In the championship game, the UTSA Roadrunners beat McNeese State to win its third Southland Conference title. UTSA also received the Southland Conference's automatic bid to the 2011 NCAA Tournament, where it beat Alabama State in the First Four before losing to Ohio State in the tournament's second round.

Format
The top eight teams, regardless of divisional standing, received a berth in the conference tournament. The championship game was broadcast nationally on ESPN2.

Bracket

Asterisk denotes game ended in overtime

External links
Southland website
2011 Southland Basketball Tournament website

Southland Conference men's basketball tournament
Tournament
Southland Conference men's basketball tournament
Southland Conference men's basketball tournament
Sports competitions in Katy, Texas
College basketball tournaments in Texas